The Usk Bridge (Welsh: Pont-Yr-Wysg) in Brecon, Powys, Wales is the town's oldest route over the River Usk. It carries the B4601 road, formerly the A40, between Brecon and Llanfaes.

History
The river was fordable at Brecon and the date of construction of the original bridge here is uncertain. The existing stone bridge was built in 1563 and replaced an earlier bridge that was washed away in the floods of 1535. It was widened in 1794 by bridge builder Thomas Edwards, at a cost of £1,000 (equivalent to £ in )

During the 20th century it was widened further with the addition of metal framed footpaths on either side. In the 1950s it required widening to take modern road traffic and a new concrete bed, described as "functional and safe but extremely ugly", was laid on top of the original stone base.

Status
The bridge is a Grade I listed structure.

References

Bridges in Powys
Bridges over the River Usk
Buildings and structures completed in 1563
Grade I listed bridges in Wales
Road bridges in Wales
Grade I listed buildings in Powys
Scheduled monuments in Powys
Stone bridges in the United Kingdom